David Jeremy Wilkin (6 June 1930 – 19 December 2017) was an English actor, best known for his contributions to the television productions of Gerry Anderson.

Born in Byfleet, Surrey, Wilkin emigrated to Toronto, Ontario, Canada after completing his studies at the Royal Academy of Dramatic Art. He had previously trained as a doctor.

Returning to Britain in the mid-1960s, Wilkin provided the voice of Virgil Tracy for the second series of Thunderbirds following the departure of the character's original voice actor, David Holliday, in 1965. In 1968 he provided the voice of Captain Ochre, the original Captain Black and many supporting characters for Captain Scarlet and the Mysterons. He was also a recurring cast member for the live-action series UFO. Other Gerry Anderson credits include Joe 90 and The Secret Service.

Wilkin played one of the leads in the 1965 TV sci-fi series Undermind as Drew Heriot, a personnel manager inadvertently drawn into a sinister plot to control human minds and sow discord in society.

Later, Wilkin made a brief uncredited cameo as Captain Forsyth in the 1977 James Bond film The Spy Who Loved Me.

In Doctor Who he appeared as Kellman in the 1975 serial Revenge of the Cybermen and as the Federation agent Dev Tarrant in the first episode of Blake's 7, "The Way Back". Wilkin's other TV credits include Dixon of Dock Green, Man in a Suitcase, New Scotland Yard, Softly, Softly: Taskforce, The New Avengers, and Reilly, Ace of Spies''. Wilkin died in December 2017 at the age of 87.

Filmography

References

External links
 

1930 births
2017 deaths
Alumni of RADA
English emigrants to Canada
English male film actors
English male stage actors
English male television actors
English male voice actors
Male actors from Toronto
People from Byfleet